This is a List of Privy Counsellors of Ireland appointed between the accession of Charles II in 1660 and the creation of the Irish Free State in 1922, when the council effectively ceased to exist.

Charles II, 1660–1685

1660

George Monck, 1st Duke of Albemarle (1608–1670) 
John Bramhall (1594–1663) 
Francis Aungier, 3rd Baron Aungier of Longford later 1st Earl of Longford (c. 1632–1700)  
Sir James Barry (1603–1672) 
John Bysse (d. 1680)   
Richard Boyle, 2nd Earl of Cork (1612–1698) 
Edward Conway, 3rd Viscount Conway later 1st Earl of Conway (c. 1623–1683)  
Michael Boyle        
William Caulfeild, 5th Baron Caulfeild later 1st Viscount Charlemont (1624–1671) 
James Margetson 
Arthur Chichester, 1st Earl of Donegall (1606–1675) 
James Donnellan (d. 1665)  
Sir Maurice Eustace (d. 1665)  
Sir Robert Forth  (c.1600-c.1663)  
Arthur Hill (d. 1663)  
Sir Theophilus Jones (d. 1685)  
John King, 1st Baron Kingston (d. 1676)  
Edward Brabazon, 2nd Earl of Meath (c. 1610–1675)  
Charles Coote, 1st Earl of Mountrath (c. 1610–1661)  
Henry Moore, 3rd Viscount Moore later 1st Earl of Drogheda (d. 1675)  
Hugh Montgomery, 3rd Viscount Montgomery later 1st Earl of Mount Alexander (c. 1625–1663)  
John Clotworthy, 1st Viscount Massereene (d. 1665)  
Henry Leslie (1580–1661) 
Sir Robert Meredyth (d. 1668)  
Sir Philip Mainwaring (d. 1661)  
James Butler, 1st Marquess of Ormonde later 1st Duke of Ormonde (1610–1688) 
Roger Boyle, 1st Earl of Orrery (1621–1679) 
Earl of Ossory (1634–1680) 
Thomas Pigot   
Arthur Jones, 2nd Viscount Ranelagh (d. 1670)  
Sir Henry Tichborne (d. 1667)  
Sir John Temple (d. 1677)  
Marcus Trevor (1618–1670) 
Arthur Annesley, 2nd Viscount Valentia later 1st Earl of Anglesey (1614–1686)    
Sir James Ware (1594–1666)  
Sir George Wentworth (d. 1666)

1661

Sir Paul Davys (d. 1672)  
Sir Edward Massey (d. 1675)  
Henry Jones (1605–1682)
Sir William Flower (d.1682)

1662

Henry Cary, 4th Viscount Falkland (1634–1663)

1663

Maurice Berkeley (1628–1690) 
Sir Thomas Clarges (c. 1618–1695)

1664

Sir Robert Byron (d. 1674) 
Sir George Lane (c. 1620–1683)

1665

Sir Edward Smith (d. 1681/2)
Wentworth Dillon, 4th Earl of Roscommon (c. 1630–1685)

1667

Richard Power, 6th Baron Power later 1st Earl of Tyrone (1630–1690) 
Sir Edward Dering, Bt (1625–1684)
John Skeffington, 2nd Viscount Massereene (1632–1695)

1668

Richard Jones, 1st Earl of Ranelagh (1641–1712)

1669

Edward Herbert, 3rd Baron Herbert of Chirbury (1633–1678)

1670

Sir Robert Booth (d. 1681)  
Sir Arthur Forbes, Bt (1623–1695)

1671

Lord O'Brien (c. 1640–1692)  
Henry Hamilton, 2nd Earl of Clanbrassil (1647–1675) 
Sir Maurice Eustace (d. 1693)  
Sir Charles Meredyth (c. 1628–1700) 
Sir Henry Ingoldsby (d. 1701)

1672

Sir William Stewart, Bt (d. 1692)  
Sir Arthur Chichester (d. 1678)
Sir William Flower (d. 1683)  
Sir John Stephens (d. 1675)

1673

Sir Hans Hamilton, Bt (d. 1682)  
Sir John Povey (d. 1679)  
Sir Henry Capel (1638–1696) 
Sir George Rawdon, Bt (1604–1684) 
Lord Ibracken (d. 1678)  
William Harbord (1635–1692)

1674

Lord Brabazon (c. 1635–1685)  
Carey Dillon (1627–1689) 
Sir Thomas Stanley (d. 1674)

1675

Sir Richard Gethin, Bt (c. 1615–c. 1685)  
Murrough Boyle, 1st Viscount Blesington (1648–1718) 
Randolph Clayton (d. 1684)  
Sir William Gore, Bt (d. c. 1703)  
Sir John Cole, Bt (d. c. 1691)  
William Hill (d. 1693)

1676

Thomas Ratcliff    
Sir James Cuffe (d. 1678)  
Sir Thomas Newcomen, Bt (d. 1689)  
Sir Cyril Wyche (c. 1632–1707)

1677
–

1678

John Vesey (1638–1716)
Sir Robert Colville (died 1697)

1679

John Parker (d. 1681)  
John Keatinge (removed 1689)

1680

Henry Hene

1681

Sir Joseph Williamson (1633–1701) 
Sir William Davys

1682

William Moreton (1641–1715) 
Anthony Dopping (1643–1697) 
Sir Richard Reynell, Bt (1626–1699) 
Francis Marsh (1627–1693) 
Sir John Davys (d. 1689)

Admitted during the reign of Charles II

Sir Oliver St George, Bt (by 1640–1695)

James II, 1685–1688

1685

Alexander MacDonnell, 3rd Earl of Antrim (1615–1699)
Vere Cromwell, 4th Earl of Ardglass (1625–1687)
Henry Hamilton-Moore, 3rd Earl of Drogheda (d. 1714) 
Sir Charles Feilding (1644–1722)
Robert FitzGerald (1637–1698)
Adam Loftus, 1st Viscount Lisburne (d. 1691)
Lemuel Kingdon
Hugh Montgomery, 2nd Earl of Mount Alexander (1651–1717)
Henry O'Brien, 7th Earl of Thomond (c. 1620–1691)
Sir Robert Hamilton, Bt (d. 1703)
John Bellew (d. 1692)

1686

Sir Charles Porter (1631–1696) 
Jenico Preston, 7th Viscount Gormanston (1643–1691)
Thomas Nugent (d. 1715) (removed 1690)

1687

Sir Alexander Fitton    
Sir Stephen Rice (1637–1715)
Simon Luttrell (1654–1698)

1688

Francis Plowden (c.1644–1712)
Sir John Trevor (1627–1717)

Admitted in 1689 by James II

Thomas FitzWilliam, 4th Viscount FitzWilliam (c.1640–1704)
Nicholas Netterville, 3rd Viscount Netterville (d. 1689)
Matthew Plunkett, 7th Baron Louth (d. 1689)
Sir William Talbot, 3rd Baronet (c.1643–1691)
Sir William Ellis (d. 1732)

William and Mary, 1689–1694

1689
–

1690

Sir Henry Fane (c. 1650–1706)  
Edward Brabazon, 4th Earl of Meath (c. 1638–1708)  
John Hely (d. 1701)  
Richard Pyne (d. 1709)  
James Butler, 2nd Duke of Ormonde (1665–1745) (attainted 1715)   
Sir Robert Southwell (d. 1702) 
Sir William Talbot, Bt (c. 1643–1691) (attainted 1691)
John Skeffington, 2nd Viscount Massereene (d. 1695)

1691

Edward FitzGerald-Villiers (c. 1652–1693)

1692

Francis Robartes (1650–1718) 
Thomas Keightley (c. 1650–1719)   
Henry de Massue, 2nd Marquis de Ruvigny later 1st Earl of Galway (1648–1720) 
Robert Smith (1670–1695)

1693

Thomas Coningsby, 1st Baron Coningsby later 1st Earl Coningsby (1657–1729)

William III, 1694–1702

1694

Narcissus Marsh (1638–1713) 
Michael Hill (1672–1699)

1695

Sir Arthur Rawdon, Bt (1662–1695) 
Sir Robert King, Bt (c. 1625–1707)  
Sir Christopher Wandesford, Bt (1656–1707) 
Robert Doyne (1651–1733) 
Thomas Brodrick (1654–1730) (removed 1711 but restored 1714)    
Sir John Hanmer, Bt (c. 1625–1701)  
Charles Coote, 3rd Earl of Mountrath (c. 1655–1709)  
Richard Aldworth (1646–1707) 
Charles Boyle, 2nd Earl of Burlington (1660–1704)

1696

William Wolseley (1640–1697) 
William Berkeley, 4th Baron Berkeley of Stratton (d. 1741)  
William Steuart (1652–1726)

1697

John Methuen (c. 1649–1706)  
Robert Molesworth (1656–1725) (removed 1714 but re-instated 1719)    
Richard Tennison (c. 1640–1705)

1701

Sir Richard Cox, Bt (1650–1733) 
Henry Petty, 2nd Baron Shelburne later 1st Earl of Shelburne (1675–1751) 
Thomas Erle (c. 1650–1720)   
Francis Gwyn (c. 1648–1734)  
Edward Smyth (1665–1720)

Admitted by 1702

William O'Brien, 3rd Earl of Inchiquin (c. 1662–1719)  
Ambrose Aungier, 2nd Earl of Longford (c. 1649–1705)  
St George Ashe (c. 1658–1718)   
Sir John Hely (d. 1701)   
Philip Savage (1644–1717) 
Richard Coote
Robert Rochfort (1652–1727) 
Sir Walter Plunket    
Sir Thomas Pakenham (1649–1706) 
William Neve    
John Pulteney

Anne II, 1702–1714

1702

Edward Southwell (1671–1730) 
Richard Freeman (d. 1710)

1703

Alan Brodrick (1656–1728) (removed 1711 but restored 1714)    
William King (1650–1729)

1704

Henry Boyle (1669–1725) 
John Perceval (1683–1748)

1705

John Cutts, 1st Baron Cutts (c. 1661–1707)

1706

Thomas Bligh (1654–1710)

1707

George Dodington (c. 1662–1720)

1708

Joseph Addison (1672–1719)

1709

Sir Constantine Phipps (1656–1723)

1710

Christopher Wandesford, 2nd Viscount Castlecomer (1684–1719)
Gustavus Hamilton (c. 1640–1723)  
Sir Thomas Southwell, Bt (1665–1720)
Robert Fitzgerald, 19th Earl of Kildare (1675–1744)
Chambre Brabazon, 5th Earl of Meath (c. 1645–1715) 
William Conolly (1662–1729) (removed in 1711 but restored in 1721)    
William Stewart, 2nd Viscount Mountjoy (d. 1728)

Admitted by 1710

Pierce Butler, 4th Viscount Ikerrin (1679–1711)

Admitted by April 1711

Sir Donough O'Brien, Bt (1642–1717) 
Richard Ingoldsby (by 1651–1712)  
Thomas Fairfax (d. 1713)  
Theophilus Butler (c. 1669–1724)  
Charles Dering (1656–1719)
Thomas Fitzmaurice (1668–1742) 
James Hamilton, 6th Earl of Abercorn (1661–1734) 
Welbore Ellis (c. 1651–1734)  
Charles Coote, 4th Earl of Mountrath (c. 1680–1715)

1711

Arthur Annesley, 5th Earl of Anglesey (c. 1678–1737)  
Samuel Dopping (1671–1720)

Admitted by 1711

Sir William Robinson (1645–1712)  
Thomas Blyth    
John Forster (1668–1720) 
William Caulfield

1712

Thomas Lindsay
Sir Pierce Butler, Bt (1670–1732)
Charles O'Neill (1676–1716)

1713

Benjamin Parry (1672–1736) 
Sir John Stanley, Bt (1663–1744)

George I, 1714–1727

1714

James Barry, 4th Earl of Barrymore (1667–1748) 
Sir William St Quintin, 3rd Baronet (c. 1662–1723)  
Henry O'Brien, 8th Earl of Thomond (1688–1741) 
John Allen (1661–1726) 
Joseph Deane (1674–1715) 
Oliver St George (1661–1731) 
Sir Henry Tichborne, Bt (1663–1731) 
John Sterne (1660–1745) 
William Whitshed (1679–1727) 
Sir Ralph Gore, Bt (1675–1733) 
Sir Gustavus Hume, Bt (c. 1670–1731)  
Sir Edward Crofton, Bt (c. 1662–1729)  
Henry Barry, 3rd Baron Barry of Santry (1680–1734) 
Charles O'Hara, 1st Baron Tyrawley (c. 1640–1724)

1715

Thomas Meredyth (b. after 1661–1719)   
Francis Palmes (b. by 1663–1719)  
John Moore (b. by 1676–1725)  
Richard Boyle, 3rd Earl of Burlington (1694–1753) 
Jeffrey Gilbert (d. 1726)  
Richard FitzWilliam, 5th Viscount FitzWilliam (c. 1677–1743)  
Richard FitzPatrick, 1st Baron Gowran (c. 1662–1727)  
Arthur St Leger, 1st Viscount Doneraile (1657–1727) 
Frederick Hamilton (c. 1663–1715)  
Martin Bladen (1682–1746) 
Arthur Cole, 1st Baron Ranelagh (1664–1754) 
William Ponsonby (1659–1724) 
George Evans, 1st Baron Carbery (c. 1680–1749)  
Thomas Knox (d. 1728)  
George St George, 1st Baron St George (c. 1658–1735)  
Richard St George (1657–1726)

1716

James Tynte (1682–1758) 
Chaworth Brabazon, 6th Earl of Meath (1686–1763) 
John Evans (b. by 1660–1724)  
Edward Synge (1659–1741)

By 1716

Heneage Finch, 1st Earl of Aylesford (c. 1649–1719)

1717

Edward Webster (b. by 1691–1755)
George Evans (1655–1720) 
Matthew Moreton (1663–1735) 
Philip Wharton, 2nd Marquess of Wharton later 1st Duke of Wharton (1698–1731) (removed 1726)    
Trevor Hill, 1st Viscount Hillsborough (1693–1742)

1718

Charles Fane, 1st Viscount Fane (1676–1744) 
Henry Coote, 5th Earl of Mountrath (1684–1720) 
Richard Tighe (1678–1736)

1719
–

1720
–

1721

Sir Richard Levinge, Bt (1656–1724) 
Viscount Forbes (1685–1765) 
Richard Boyle, 2nd Viscount Shannon (c. 1675–1740)   
Edward Hopkins (1675–1736) 
John Villiers, 5th Viscount Grandison later 1st Earl Grandison (c. 1682–1766)

1722

Marmaduke Coghill (1673–1739)
Bernard Hale (1677–1729)

1723

Algernon Coote, 6th Earl of Mountrath (1689–1744)

By 1723

Charles Lennox, 1st Duke of Richmond (1672–1723) 
Thomas Howard, 6th Baron Howard of Effingham (1682–1725) 
George Cholmondeley, 1st Baron Newborough, later 2nd Earl of Cholmondeley (1666–1733) 
Thomas Pitt, 1st Baron Londonderry later 1st Earl of Londonderry (c. 1688–1729)  
Stephen Stanley

1724

Henry Downes (d. 1735)    
St John Brodrick (c. 1685–1728)  
James O'Hara, 2nd Baron Tyrawley (1682–1773) 
Theophilus Bolton (d. 1744)  
Thomas Clutterbuck (1697–1742) 
Hugh Boulter (1672–1742) 
Thomas Wyndham (1681–1745)

1725

Richard West (c. 1691–1726)  
Thomas Dalton (d. 1730)

1726

Brinsley Butler, 2nd Baron Newtown-Butler later 1st Viscount Lanesborough (1670–1736) 
Sir Thomas Taylor, Bt (1662–1736) 
William Caulfeild, 2nd Viscount Charlemont (d. 1726)   
Thomas Fitzmaurice, 1st Earl of Kerry (1668–1741) 
Thomas Southwell, 2nd Baron Southwell (1698–1766) 
Michael Burke, 10th Earl of Clanricarde (1686–1726) 
Owen Wynne (1665–1737)

George II, 1727–1760

1727

Ralph Lambert (d. 1732)  
Brabazon Ponsonby, 2nd Viscount Duncannon later 1st Earl of Bessborough (1679–1758) 
Joshua Allen, 2nd Viscount Allen (1685–1742) 
John Rogerson (1676–1741) 
Henry Maxwell (1669–1730) 
Samuel Molyneux (1689–1728) 
Richard Edgcumbe (1680–1758)

1728

James Reynolds (1684–1747) 
Francis Seymour-Conway, 1st Baron Conway (1679–1732) 
François de La Rochefoucauld, marquis de Montandre (1672–1739)

1729

James King, 4th Baron Kingston (1693–1761) 
William St Lawrence, 14th Baron Howth (1688–1748)
Richard Lambart, 4th Earl of Cavan (d. 1742)

1730

John Hoadly (1678–1746) 
William James Conolly (1706–1754) 
Thomas Marlay (c. 1678–1756)

1731

Walter Carey (1685–1757)

Admitted by 1731

Hugh Boscawen, 1st Viscount Falmouth (c. 1680–1734)  
David Creighton    
James Fynle

1732

Edward Southwell (1705–1755)
Thomas Carter (c. 1682–1763) (removed 1754 but reinstated 1755)

1733

Henry Boyle (1682–1764) 
Sir Thomas Prendergast, Bt (c. 1700–1760)  
Sir Edward Crofton, Bt (1687–1739) 
Richard Molesworth, 3rd Viscount Molesworth (1680–1758) 
Sir Henry King, Bt (1680–1741) 
William Graham (1706–1749) 
Francis Burton (1696–1744)

1734

Arthur Price (d. 1752)  
Charles Cobbe (d. 1765)    
Pattee Byng, 2nd Viscount Torrington (1699–1747)

1735

Henry Bingham (1688–1743) 
William Flower, 1st Baron Castle Durrow (1685–1746)

1736

Gustavus Hamilton, 2nd Viscount Boyne (1710–1746)

1737

Thomas Watson-Wentworth, 1st Earl of Malton later 1st Marquess of Rockingham (1693–1750) 
Luke Gardiner (b. by 1690–1755)  
Edward Walpole (1706–1784) 
Thomas Pearce (b. after 1664–1739)

1738
–

1739

Robert Napier (c. 1666–1739)  
James Hamilton, 7th Earl of Abercorn (1686–1744) 
Robert Jocelyn (c. 1688–1756)

1740

Gervais Parker (c. 1679–1750)  
Henry Singleton (1682–1759)

1741

Viscount Duncannon (1704–1793)

1742

John Bowes (1691–1767) 
Henry Vane (c. 1705–1758)

1743

Sir Compton Domvile, Bt (1696–1768)

1744

Gerald de Courcy, 24th Baron Kingsale (1700–1759)

1745

Richard Liddell (c. 1694–1746)

1746

Somerset Butler, 8th Viscount Ikerrin later 1st Earl of Carrick (1719–1774) 
Richard Wingfield, 1st Viscount Powerscourt (1697–1751) 
Clotworthy Skeffington, 5th Viscount Massereene later 1st Earl of Massereene (d. 1757)  
James Hamilton, 1st Viscount of Limerick later 1st Earl of Clanbrassil (c. 1691–1758)  
William FitzMaurice, 2nd Earl of Kerry (1694–1747) 
James FitzGerald, 20th Earl of Kildare later 1st Duke of Leinster (1722–1773) 
William FitzWilliam, 3rd Earl FitzWilliam (1719–1756) 
Wills Hill, 2nd Viscount Hillsborough later 1st Marquess of Downshire (1718–1793)    
Charles Moore, 2nd Baron Moore later 1st Earl of Charleville (1712–1764)

1747

George Stone (c. 1708–1764)  
Edward Weston (1703–1770)

1748

Henry Conyngham (1705–1781)
Josiah Hort (c. 1674–1751)
Edward Moore, 5th Earl of Drogheda (1701–1758) 
Sir Compton Domvile, Bt (c. 1686–1768)
Sir Arthur Gore, Bt (1703–1773) 
John Ponsonby (1713–1787) (removed 1770 but restored by 1774)    
William Stewart, 1st Earl of Blessington (1709–1769)

1749

Humphrey Butler, nth Viscount Lanesborough later Earl of Lanesborough (c. 1700–1768)  
Robert Rochfort, 1st Baron Belfield later 1st Earl of Belvedere (1708–1772)

1750

Francis Seymour-Conway, 2nd Baron Conway later 1st Marquess of Hertford (1718–1794) 
Arthur Hill, 1st Viscount Dungannon (c. 1694–1771)

1751

Lord George Sackville (1716–1785) (removed 1760) 
Henry Maule (d. 1758)  
St George Caulfeild (1697–1778) 
Hayes St Leger, 4th Viscount Doneraile (1702–1767)

1752
–

1753

William Bristow    
John Ryder (c. 1697–1775)  
Joseph Damer, 1st Baron Milton later 1st Earl of Dorchester (1718–1798) 
Sir William Yorke (c. 1700–1776)  
Nicholas Loftus, 1st Baron Loftus later 1st Viscount Loftus (1687–1763)
William O'Brien, 4th Earl of Inchiquin (c. 1700–1777)  
Sir Thomas Taylor, Bt (1686–1757)

1754

John Petty, 1st Earl of Shelburne (1706–1761)

1755

Alexander Macdonnell, 5th Earl of Antrim (1713–1775) 
Thomas Bermingham, 15th Baron Athenry later 1st Earl of Louth (1717–1799) (removed 1770 but restored 1783)    
William Bristow (c. 1698–1758)  
Hercules Langford Rowley (1708–1794) (removed 1770 but restored 1782)    
Henry Seymour Conway (1719–1795) 
William Fortescue (1722–1806) 
Michael Cox (d. 1779)

1756

James Hamilton, 8th Earl of Abercorn (1712–1789) 
John Leslie, 10th Earl of Rothes (c. 1698–1767)

1757

Nathaniel Clements (1705–1777) 
Edward Willes (d. 1768)  
Richard Rigby (1722–1788) 
Anthony Malone (1700–1776)

1758

John Proby, 1st Baron Carysfort (1720–1772) 
Robert Jocelyn, 2nd Viscount Jocelyn later 1st Earl of Roden (1731–1797) 
William Carmichael (d. 1765)  
Charles Gardiner (1720–1769) 
Thomas Nugent, 6th Earl of Westmeath (1714–1792) (removed 1771 but restored 1774)

1759
–

George III, 1760–1820

1760

Charles Moore, 6th Earl of Drogheda later 1st Marquess of Drogheda (1730–1822) 
Robert Maxwell, 2nd Viscount Farnham later 1st Earl of Farnham (c. 1720–1779)  
Benjamin Burton (1709–1767)

1761

Francis Andrews (1718–1774) 
Thomas Conolly (1738–1803) 
William Cavendish, 4th Duke of Devonshire (1720–1764) 
Charles Coote, 7th Earl of Mountrath (1725–1802) 
Richard Aston (d. 1778)  
John de Burgh, 11th Earl of Clanricarde (1720–1782) (removed 1761)    
Sir William Fownes, Bt (1709–1778) (removed 1770)    
William Gerard Hamilton (1729–1796) 
Warden Flood (1694–1764)

1762

Sir James Caldwell, Bt (c. 1722–1784)

1763

Viscount Boyle (1728–1807) (removed 1770 but restored 1774)    
George Beresford, 2nd Earl of Tyrone later 1st Marquess of Waterford (1735–1800)

1764

Philip Tisdall (1703–1777) 
Nicholas Hume-Loftus, 2nd Viscount Loftus later 1st Earl of Ely (1714–1766) 
John Gore (1718–1784)
John Hely-Hutchinson (1724–1794)

1765

Richard Robinson (c. 1708–1794)  
Richard Clayton (d. 1770)  
Brinsley Butler, 2nd Earl of Lanesborough (1728–1779) (removed 1770 but reinstated 1774)    
Francis Seymour-Conway (1743–1822)
Anthony Foster (1705–1779)

1766

William Crosbie, 2nd Baron Brandon later 1st Earl of Glandore (1716–1781) 
Sir William Mayne, Bt (1722–1794) (removed 1770)    
William Brownlow (1726–1794) 
Augustus Hervey (1724–1779) 
Richard Fitzwilliam, 6th Viscount Fitzwilliam (1711–1776) 
Owen Wynne (1723–1789) 
James Hamilton, 2nd Earl of Clanbrassil (1730–1798) 
William Pole (b. by 1727–1781) (removed 1771)

1767

Theophilus Jones (1729–1811) 
Henry Maxwell (c. 1720–1798)  
Arthur Upton (1715–1768) 
Frederick Hervey (1730–1803) 
Lord Frederick Campbell (1729–1816) 
Arthur Smythe (d. 1771)

1768

James Hewitt, 1st Baron Lifford later 1st Viscount Lifford (1712–1789) 
Thomas St Lawrence, 1st Earl of Howth (1730–1801) 
John Beresford (1738–1805) 
Sir Henry Cavendish, Bt (1707–1776) 
Sir Robert Deane, Bt (1707–1770) 
Sir Thomas Maude (1726–1777) 
Robert Nugent, 1st Viscount Clare later 1st Earl Nugent (1702–1788) 
Arthur Chichester, 5th Earl of Donegall later 1st Marquess of Donegall (1739–1799)

1769

George Macartney (1737–1806)

1770

Sir Archibald Acheson (1718–1790) 
James Fortescue (1725–1782) 
Henry King (1733–1821) 
Joseph Leeson, 1st Earl of Milltown (1711–1783) 
Ralph Howard (c. 1726–1789)  
Edward Cary (c. 1716–1797)  
Sir William Osborne, Bt (c. 1722–1783)  
Sir Arthur Brooke, Bt (1726–1785) 
Marcus Paterson (1712–1787)

1771

Silver Oliver (1736–1798) 
Edmund Pery (1719–1806) 
Henry Loftus, 4th Viscount Loftus later 1st Earl of Ely (1709–1783) 
Viscount Sudley (1734–1809)

1772

John Cradock (c. 1708–1778)  
John Blaquiere (1732–1812) 
George Forbes, 5th Earl of Granard (1740–1780)

1773
–

1774

Charles Coote (1738–1800)

1775

George Eliott (1717–1790) 
Sir John Irwin (c. 1728–1788)  
James Stopford, 2nd Earl of Courtown (1731–1810) 
Henry Flood (1732–1791) (removed 1782 but restored 1782)

1776

Jemmet Brown (d. 1782)  
Arthur Annesley, 8th Viscount Valentia later 1st Earl of Mountnorris (1744–1816) 
Sir Capel Molyneux, Bt (1717–1797)
Agmondisham Vesey (1708–1785)
Garret Wellesley, 1st Earl of Mornington (1735–1784) 
Joshua Cooper (1732–1800)

1777

Sir Richard Heron (1726–1805) 
Thomas Waite (1718–1780) 
William FitzGerald, 2nd Duke of Leinster (1749–1804) 
Sir Robert Deane, Bt (1745–1818) 
Edward Pakenham, 2nd Baron Longford (1743–1792) 
John Pomeroy (1724–1790) 
William Burton (1733–1796) 
Henry Theophilus Clements (1734–1795) 
James Dennis (1721–1782) 
Richard Jackson (c. 1729–1789)  
Walter Hussey-Burgh (1742–1783) 
John Scott (1739–1798)

1778
–

1779

Robert Fowler (c. 1726–1801)  
John Foster (1740–1828) 
Sir Henry Cavendish, Bt (1732–1804) 
Charles Agar (1736–1809)

1780

William Eden (1744–1814) 
Murrough O'Brien, 5th Earl of Inchiquin later 1st Marquess of Thomond (1726–1808) 
Luke Gardiner (1745–1798)

1781

John O'Neill (1740–1798)
Denis Daly (1748–1791)

1782

Richard FitzPatrick (1748–1813) 
John Burgoyne (1723–1792) 
Robert Cuninghame (1726–1801)    
Barry Yelverton (1736–1805) 
William Grenville (1759–1834) 
Joseph Deane Bourke (d. 1794)  
James Cuffe (b. by 1747–1821)

1783

Henry de Burgh, 12th Earl of Clanricarde later 1st Marquess of Clanricarde (1743–1797) 
William Windham (1750–1810) 
Charles Loftus (1738–1806) 
James Caulfeild, 1st Earl of Charlemont (1728–1799) 
Thomas Pelham (1756–1826)
Henry Grattan (1746–1820) (expelled 1798 but re-admitted 1806)    
George Ogle (1742–1814)
Robert Stewart (1739–1821) 
John Fitzgibbon (1748–1802) 
Thomas Kelly (1724–1809)

1784

Thomas Orde (1740–1807) 
Richard Wellesley, 2nd Earl of Mornington later 1st Marquess Wellesley (1760–1842) 
William Augustus Pitt (1728–1809) 
William Ponsonby (1744–1806) 
James Agar, 1st Viscount Clifden (1735–1788)

1785

John Crosbie, 2nd Earl of Glandore (1753–1815) 
Thomas Taylour, 1st Earl of Bective (1724–1795)
David La Touche (1729–1817) 
Sir Skeffington Smyth, Bt (1745–1797)
George Mason-Villiers, 2nd Earl Grandison (1751–1800)
Stephen Moore, 1st Earl Mount Cashell (1730–1790)
John Browne, 3rd Earl of Altamont later 1st Marquess of Sligo (1756–1809) 
John Monck Mason (1726–1809)

1786

Sir John Parnell, Bt (1744–1801) 
Sir Lucius O'Brien, Bt (1731–1795) 
Charles Dillon-Lee (1745–1813) 
Randal MacDonnell, 6th Earl of Antrim later 1st Marquess of Antrim (1789 creation) (1749–1791) 
Viscount Luttrell (1743–1821)

1787

Hugh Carleton (1739–1826) 
Alleyne Fitzherbert (1753–1839)

1788
–

1789

Robert Hobart, 4th Earl of Buckinghamshire (1760–1816) 
Arthur Wolfe (1739–1803) 
John Armstrong (1732–1791) 
George Agar (1754–1815) 
John Proby, 1st Earl of Carysfort (1751–1828) 
James Fitzgerald (1742–1835)

1790

Richard Longfield (1734–1811)

1791
–

1792

George Warde (d. 1803)  
Sir Hercules Langrishe, Bt (1729–1811)

1793

George Nugent, 7th Earl of Westmeath (1760–1814) 
Charles Fitzgerald (1756–1810) 
William Forward-Howard (1761–1818) 
Arthur Acheson, 2nd Viscount Gosford later 1st Earl of Gosford (c. 1745–1807)  
George Lewis Jones (d. 1804)  
Arthur Hill, 2nd Marquess of Downshire (1753–1801) (removed 1800)

1794

Edward King, 1st Earl of Kingston (1726–1797) 
Denis Browne (c. 1760–1828)   
Sylvester Douglas (1743–1823) 
John Hamilton, 1st Marquess of Abercorn (1756–1818) 
William Beresford (1743–1819)

1795

Viscount Milton (1746–1808) 
John Dawson, 1st Earl of Portarlington (1744–1798) 
William Newcome (1729–1800) 
Robert Ross (1729–1799) 
Robert Dillon, 1st Baron Clonbrock (1754–1795) 
Isaac Corry (1752–1813)

1796

Barry Maxwell, 1st Earl of Farnham (1723–1800) 
Sackville Hamilton (1732–1818) 
Lodge de Montmorency (1747–1822) 
Richard Hely-Hutchinson, 2nd Baron Donoughmore later 1st Earl of Donoughmore (1756–1825)

1797

Edmund Pery, 2nd Baron Glentworth later 1st Earl of Limerick (1758–1844) 
Walter Butler, 18th Earl of Ormonde later 1st Marquess of Ormonde (1770–1820) 
Viscount Castlereagh (1769–1822) 
Robert Jocelyn, 2nd Earl of Roden (1756–1820)

1798

Sir Ralph Abercromby (1734–1801) 
Richard Annesley (1745–1824) 
John Toler (1745–1831)

1799

Thomas O'Beirne (c. 1748–1823)

1800

William Stuart (1755–1822) 
St George Daly (1758–1829) 
John Stewart (1757–1825)
Charles Coote (1754–1823) 
Viscount Loftus (1770–1845)

1801

John Ormsby Vandeleur (c. 1765–1828) 
Maurice Fitzgerald (1774–1849) 
William Handcock, 1st Viscount Castlemaine (1761–1839) 
John de Burgh, 13th Earl of Clanricarde (1744–1808) 
John Staples (1736–1820) 
Henry Beresford, 2nd Marquess of Waterford (1772–1826) 
Sir William Medows (1738–1813) 
Sir Michael Smith, Bt (1740–1808) 
Charles Abbot (1757–1829) 
Robert Ward (1754–1831)

1802

Charles Brodrick (1761–1822)
Robert Clements, 1st Earl of Leitrim (1732–1804) 
Sir John Mitford (1748–1830) 
William Wickham (1761–1840)

1803

George Chichester, 2nd Marquess of Donegall (1769–1844) 
Henry Edward Fox (1755–1811) 
Standish O'Grady (1766–1840) 
William Downes (1751–1826) 
William Cathcart, 10th Lord Cathcart later 1st Earl Cathcart (1755–1843)

1804

Sir Evan Nepean, Bt (1752–1822) 
Charles Lindsay (1760–1846)   
John Creighton, 1st Earl Erne (1731–1828)

1805

Sir Lawrence Parsons, Bt (1758–1841) 
George Knox (1765–1827) 
Charles Long (1760–1838) 
William Plunket (1764–1854)

1806

William Elliot (1766–1818)
George Ponsonby (1755–1817)
George Forbes, 6th Earl of Granard (1760–1837) 
Denis Bowes Daly (1745–1821) 
Lord Henry FitzGerald (1761–1829) 
Sir John Newport, Bt (1756–1843)
John Philpot Curran (1750–1817) 
Charles Stanhope, 3rd Earl of Harrington (1753–1829)

1807

Sir Arthur Wellesley (1769–1852) 
Thomas Manners-Sutton, 1st Baron Manners (1756–1842) 
William Saurin (1757–1839)

1808

Patrick Duigenan (1735–1816) 
Sir George Hill, Bt (1763–1839)

1809

William O'Brien, 2nd Marquess of Thomond (c. 1765–1846)  
William Bagwell (1776–1826) 
Charles O'Neill, 1st Earl O'Neill (1779–1841) 
Charles Vereker (1768–1842) 
John Maxwell-Barry (1767–1838) 
Richard Trench, 2nd Earl of Clancarty (1767–1837) 
Robert Dundas (1771–1851) 
Henry Boyle, 3rd Earl of Shannon (1771–1842) 
Thomas Skeffington (1772–1843) 
Euseby Cleaver (1746–1819) 
William Wellesley-Pole (1763–1845) 
Howe Browne, 2nd Marquess of Sligo (1788–1845)

1810

William FitzGerald (c. 1782–1843)   
John Bourke, 4th Earl of Mayo (1766–1849)

1811
–

1812

John Hope (1765–1823) 
Robert Peel (1788–1850)

1813

John Preston, 1st Baron Tara (1764–1821) 
Sir George Hewett, Bt (1750–1840)

1814

Sir William McMahon, Bt (1776–1837)

1815
–

1816

Sir George Beckwith (1753–1823)

1817

Nicholas Vansittart (1766–1851)

1818

John Radcliff (1765–1843) 
Charles Grant (1778–1866)

1819
–

George IV, 1820–1830

1820

Sir David Baird (1757–1829) 
Lord John Beresford (1773–1862) 
Power Le Poer Trench (1770–1839)

1821

Henry Goulburn (1784–1856)

1822

Charles Kendal Bushe (1767–1843) 
Sir Samuel Auchmuty (1756–1822) 
William Magee (1766–1831) 
Richard Laurence (1760–1838) 
Stapleton Cotton, 1st Baron Combermere later 1st Viscount Combermere (1773–1865)

1823

Nathaniel Alexander (1760–1840)

1824
–

1825

Sir George Murray (1772–1846)

1826
–

1827

Henry Joy (d. 1838)  
William Lamb (1779–1848) 
Sir Anthony Hart (c. 1754–1831)

1828

Sir John Byng (1772–1860) 
Lord Francis Leveson-Gower (1800–1857)

1829
–

William IV, 1830–1837

1830

Sir Henry Hardinge (1785–1856) 
John Doherty (1783–1850)

1831

Francis Blackburne (1782–1867) 
Edward Smith-Stanley (1799–1869) 
Thomas Spring Rice (1790–1866) 
Valentine Lawless, 2nd Baron Cloncurry (1773–1853) 
Augustus FitzGerald, 3rd Duke of Leinster (1791–1874) 
Sir Hussey Vivian, Bt (1775–1842) 
Richard Whately (1787–1863)

1832

Francis Caulfeild, 2nd Earl of Charlemont (1775–1863)

1833

John Brabazon, 10th Earl of Meath (1772–1851) 
Edward Littleton (1791–1863)

1834

Lord Killeen (1791–1869) 
Nathaniel Clements, 2nd Earl of Leitrim (1768–1854) 
Dominick Browne (1787–1860) 
Valentine Browne, 2nd Earl of Kenmare (1788–1853) 
John Hely-Hutchinson, 3rd Earl of Donoughmore (1787–1851)

1835

Sir Edward Sugden (1781–1875) 
Frederick Shaw (1799–1876) 
William Gregory (1762–1840) 
Thomas Langlois Lefroy (1776–1869) 
Louis Perrin (1782–1864) 
Cornelius O'Callaghan, 1st Viscount Lismore (1775–1857) 
Thomas Taylour, 2nd Marquess of Headfort (1787–1870) 
Viscount Morpeth (1802–1864) 
Michael O'Loghlen (1789–1842)

1836

Sir Edward Blakeney (1778–1868) 
John Richards (1790–1872) 
Richard Talbot, 2nd Baron Talbot de Malahide (1766–1849) 
Anthony Richard Blake (1785–1849)

Victoria, 1837–1901

1837

Henry Villiers-Stuart (1803–1874) 
Charles Brownlow (1795–1847) 
Stephen Woulfe (1787–1840) 
Thomas Francis Kennedy (1788–1879)

1838

Sir Patrick Bellew, Bt (1798–1866) 
Nicholas Ball (1791–1865)

1839

Arthur Moore (1765–1846) 
Maziere Brady (1796–1871) 
Stephen Sandes (1778–1842)

1840

David Richard Pigot (c. 1803–1873)

1841

Charles Dickenson (1795–1842) 
John Campbell, 1st Baron Campbell (1779–1861) 
George Hampden Evans (d. 1842)  
James Grattan (1783–1854) 
Lord Eliot (1798–1877) 
Edward Pennefather (c. 1774–1847)

1842

Thomas Cusack-Smith (1795–1866) 
Edward Stopford (d. 1850)

1843

Richard Keatinge (1793–1876)

1844
–

1845

Sir Thomas Fremantle, Bt (1798–1890) 
Edward Lucas (1787–1871)

1846

Richard Wilson Greene (d. 1861)  
Earl of Lincoln (1811–1864) 
Richard Moore (d. 1857)  
Henry Labouchere (1798–1869) 
Alexander Macdonnell (1794–1875) 
Thomas Plunket (1792–1866) 
Sir Thomas Esmonde, Bt (1786–1868) 
William Tighe (1794–1878)

1847

Sir William Somerville, Bt (1802–1873)

1848

John FitzPatrick (1811–1883) 
James Henry Monahan (1803–1878)

1849
–

1850

Thomas Stewart Townsend (1801–1852) 
John Hatchell (1788–1870)

1851
–

1852

Lord Naas (1822–1872) 
Joseph Napier (1804–1882)

1853

John Wynne (1801–1865) 
Joseph Henderson Singer (1786–1866) 
Sir John Young, Bt (1807–1876) 
Abraham Brewster (1796–1874)

1854
–

1855

John Colborne, 1st Baron Seaton (1778–1863) 
William Keogh (1817–1878)
Edward Horsman (1807–1876)

1856

John FitzGerald (1816–1889)

1857

Henry Arthur Herbert (d. 1866)

1858

James Whiteside (1804–1876) 
Robert Jocelyn, 3rd Earl of Roden (1788–1870) 
Philip Cecil Crampton (1782–1862) 
Henry Moore, 3rd Marquess of Drogheda (1825–1892)

1859

Edward Cardwell (1813–1886)

1860

Rickard Deasy (1812–1883) 
Sir George Brown (1790–1865)

1861

Thomas O'Hagan (1812–1885) 
Sir Robert Peel, Bt (1822–1895)

1862

Marcus Beresford (1801–1885)

1863
–

1864

Richard Chenevix Trench (1807–1886)

1865

James Anthony Lawson (1817–1887) 
Sir Hugh Rose (1801–1885)

1866

Chichester Parkinson-Fortescue (1823–1898) 
Fitzstephen French (1801–1873) 
William H. F. Cogan (1823–1894) 
John Edward Walsh (1816–1869) 
John George (1804–1871) 
Major-General Francis Plunkett Dunne (d. 1874)  
Michael Morris (1826–1901)    
Samuel Butcher (1811–1876)

1867

Hedges Eyre Chatterton (1819–1910) 
Mountifort Longfield (1802–1884) 
Jonathan Christian (1808–1887) 
Somerset Lowry-Corry, 4th Earl Belmore (1835–1913) 
Robert Warren (1817–1897)

1868

Albert Edward, Prince of Wales (1841–1910) 
Prince George, 2nd Duke of Cambridge (1819–1904) 
John Wilson-Patten (1802–1892) 
Edward Litton (1787–1870) 
Sir Thomas Larcom, Bt (1801–1879) 
John Thomas Ball (1815–1898) 
Edward Sullivan (1822–1885)

1869

Sir Walter Crofton (1815–1897) 
Charles Monck, 4th Viscount Monck (1819–1894)

1870

Charles Robert Barry (1824–1897) 
Sir William Mansfield (1819–1876) 
George Alexander Hamilton (1802–1871)

1871

Marquess of Hartington (1833–1908) 
William Henry Gregory (1817–1892)

1872

Richard Dowse (1824–1890) 
Christopher Palles (1831–1920)

1873
–

1874

Hugh Law (1818–1883) 
Sir Michael Hicks-Beach, Bt (1837–1916) 
William Brooke (1796–1881)

1875

Henry Ormsby (1812–1887)
Sir John Michel (1804–1886) 
George Augustus Chichester May (1815–1892)

1876

Stephen Woulfe Flanagan (1817–1891)

1877

Edward Gibson (1837–1913)

1878

James Lowther (1840–1904)

1879

Gerald FitzGibbon (1837–1909)
Charles FitzGerald, 4th Duke of Leinster (1819–1887) 
William Brabazon, 11th Earl of Meath (1803–1887) 
John Beresford, 5th Marquess of Waterford (1844–1895) 
Thomas Taylour, 3rd Marquess of Headfort (1822–1894)

1880

Henry Bruen (1828–1912) 
William Edward Forster (1818–1886) 
Sir Thomas Montagu Steele (1820–1890)

1881

Charles Owen O'Conor (1838–1906) 
William Moore Johnson (1828–1918)

1882

George Trevelyan (1838–1928 )

1883

Andrew Porter (1837–1919)

1884

John Naish (1841–1890)

1885

Sir Henry Campbell-Bannerman (1836–1908) 
Samuel Walker (1832–1911) 
Sir Patrick Joseph Keenan (1826–1894) 
Hugh Holmes (1840–1916) 
Sir William Hart Dyke, Bt (1837–1931)
Prince Edward of Saxe-Weimar (1823–1902)

1886

Arthur MacMurrough Kavanagh (1831–1889)
W. H. Smith (1825–1891) 
Edward King-Harman (1838–1888) 
John Monroe (1839–1899) 
John Morley (1838–1923)
Sir John Lentaigne (1803–1886)
John Young (1826–1915)

1887

Arthur Balfour (1848–1930)
John George Gibson (1846–1923)
Reginald Brabazon, 12th Earl of Meath (1841–1929 )
Sir Redvers Buller (1839–1908) 
Ion Hamilton (1839–1898)
James Hamilton, 2nd Duke of Abercorn (1838–1913)

1888

Peter O'Brien (1842–1914) 
Edward Leeson, 6th Earl of Milltown (1835–1890) 
Gerald FitzGerald, 5th Duke of Leinster (1851–1893)

1889

Sir Henry Bruce, Bt (1820–1907) 
William Brownlow Forde (1823–1902)
Sir West Ridgeway (1844–1930)
Dodgson Hamilton Madden (1840–1928)

1890

James Murphy (1826–1901)
William O'Brien (1832–1899)  
William Wentworth FitzWilliam Dick (1805–1892)
Garnet Wolseley, 1st Viscount Wolseley (1833–1913)

1891

William Jackson (1840–1917)

1892

John Atkinson (1844–1932) 
Hugh Hyacinth O'Rorke MacDermot, The MacDermot]] (1834–1904) 
Arthur Plunkett, 11th Earl of Fingall (1859–1929) 
Charles Vane-Tempest-Stewart, 6th Marquess of Londonderry (1852–1915)

1893

Thomas Alexander Dickson (1833–1909)
Joseph Meade (1839–1900) 
Christopher Talbot Redington (1847–1899)

1894
–

1895

Cecil Rhodes (1853–1902)
Charles Hemphill (1822–1908) 
Gerald Balfour (1853–1945)
Frederick Roberts, 1st Baron Roberts later 1st Earl Roberts (1832–1914)

1896

Sir Richard Martin, Bt (1831–1901) 
Thomas Sinclair (1838–1914) 
Arthur Smith-Barry (1843–1925)
Edward Carson (1854–1935)

1897

Frederick Hamilton-Temple-Blackwood, 1st Marquess of Dufferin and Ava (1826–1902) 
Horace Plunkett (1854–1932) 
William Pirrie (1847–1924)
Mervyn Wingfield, 7th Viscount Powerscourt (1836–1904) 
William Drennan Andrews (1832–1924)
George, Duke of York, later George V (1865–1936)

1898

Luke Dillon, 4th Baron Clonbrock (1834–1917)

1899

Edward Henry Cooper (1827–1902) 
Windham Wyndham-Quin, 4th Earl of Dunraven and Mount-Earl (1841–1926)

1900

Prince Arthur, 1st Duke of Connaught and Strathearn (1850–1942) 
Sir David Harrel (1841–1939) 
George Wyndham (1863–1913)
Dermot Bourke, 7th Earl of Mayo (1851–1927)

Edward VII, 1901–1910

1901
–

1902

Anthony Nugent, 11th Earl of Westmeath (1870–1933) 
Jonathan Hogg (1847–1930) 
John Crichton, 4th Earl Erne (1839–1914)
William Kenny (1846–1921)
Sir Daniel Dixon, Bt (1844–1907) 
James Butler, 3rd Marquess of Ormonde (1844–1919)
Sir John Ross, Bt (1854–1935) 
Henry Robinson (1857–1927)

1903

Frederick Stringer Wrench (1849–1926)
Sir Antony MacDonnell (1844–1925)
Sir John Colomb (1838–1909) 
Thomas Andrews (1843–1916)

1904

Francis Grenfell (1841–1925)

1905

Walter Long (1854–1924) 
Uchter Knox, 5th Earl of Ranfurly (1856–1933) 
Sir Frederick Falkiner (1831–1908) 
James Campbell (1851–1931)
James Bryce (1838–1922)
Sir Patrick Coll (1839–1917) 
Richard Cherry (1859–1923)
Sir Rowland Blennerhasset, Bt (1839–1909)

1906

Sir Francis Workman-Macnaghten, Bt (1828–1911)

1907

Augustine Birrell (1850–1933)
Richard Edmund Meredith (1855–1916)
Alexander Montgomery Carlisle (1854–1926) 
Robert Young (1822–1917)

1908

Sir Neville Lyttelton (1845–1931)
Bernard FitzPatrick, 2nd Baron Castletown (1849–1937) 
Thomas Russell (1841–1920) 
Sir James Brown Dougherty (1844–1934)

1909

Sir William Butler (1838–1910) 
Michael Finucane (1851–1911) 
William Frederick Bailey (1857–1917)
James Owens Wylie (1845–1935) 
Redmond Barry (1866–1913)

George V, 1910–1922

1910

Sir Robert Matheson (1845–1926)

1911

Thomas Shillington (1835–1925)
Michael Francis Cox (1852–1926)
Robert Glendinning (1844–1928) 
Lawrence Ambrose Waldron (1858–1923) 
Charles O'Connor (1854–1928)

1912

Thomas O'Shaughnessy (1850–1933)
Sir Arthur Paget (1851–1928) 
Ignatius O'Brien (1857–1930)
Ivor Guest, 1st Baron Ashby St Ledgers later 1st Viscount Wimborne (1873–1939)

1913

William Huston Dodd (1844–1930)
Edward Archdale (1850–1916)
Thomas Molony (1865–1949)
John Moriarty (d. 1915)

1914

W. J. M. Starkie (1860–1920) 
Jonathan Pim (1858–1949) 
Sir Matthew Nathan (1862–1939)

1915

Stephen Ronan (1848–1925)
John Gordon (1849–1922)

1916

Sir Lovick Friend (1856–1944)
Walter MacMurrough Kavanagh (1856–1922) 
H. H. Asquith (1852–1928) 
Sir John Maxwell (1859–1929)
Denis Charles Joseph O'Conor, The O'Conor Don (1869–1917)
Sir Robert Chalmers (1858–1938) 
Henry Duke (1855–1939)
Sir Walter Boyd, Bt (1833–1918)

1917

Sir Bryan Mahon (1862–1930) 
James O'Connor (1872–1931) 
Arthur Gore, 6th Earl of Arran (1868–1958)
Sir William Goulding, Bt (1856–1925)

1918

Ian Macpherson (1880–1937)
Edward Shortt (1862–1935) 
Sir Frederick Shaw (1861–1942)
John Beresford, 5th Baron Decies (1866–1944) 
Arthur Warren Samuels (1852–1925) 
Sir Dunbar Barton, Bt (1853–1937) 
Sir William Byrne (1859–1935) 
Charles Vane-Tempest-Stewart, 7th Marquess of Londonderry (1878–1949) 
Bernard Forbes, 8th Earl of Granard (1874–1948) 
Sir Stanley Harrington (1856–1949) 
Sir Thomas Stafford, Bt (1857–1935)
Frank Brooke (1851–1920) 
John French, 1st Viscount French later 1st Earl of Ypres (1852–1925)

1919

Robert Sharman-Crawford (1853–1934)
Denis Henry (1864–1925) 
John Campbell White (d. 1923) 
Sir James Johnston (1849–1924)
John Bernard (1860–1927)

1920

Martin Morris, 2nd Baron Killanin (1867–1927)
James MacMahon (1865–1954) 
Samuel Cunningham (1862–1946)
Sir Nevil Macready (1862–1946)
Sir Hamar Greenwood, Bt (1870–1948)
Sir John Anderson (1882–1958) 
Hugh T. Barrie (1860–1922) 
John Blake Powell (1870–1923)

1921

Edward Archdale (1853–1943)
Sir Andrew Beattie (d. 1923)  
Andrew Jameson (1855–1941) 
Sir James Craig, Bt (1871–1940)
Hugh Pollock (1852–1937) 
Dawson Bates (1876–1949)
J. M. Andrews (1871–1956) 
Geoffrey Browne, 3rd Baron Oranmore and Browne (1861–1927)
William Moore (1864–1944) 
G. F. Stewart (1851–1928)
Frederick Hamilton-Temple-Blackwood, 3rd Marquess of Dufferin and Ava (1875–1930)
Hugh O'Neill (1883–1982) 
Thomas Watters Brown (1879–1944) 
Robert Wallace (1860–1929) 
Robert Percival-Maxwell (1870–1932) 
Thomas Hamilton (1842–1925)
William Robert Young (1856–1933) 
Edmund FitzAlan-Howard, 1st Viscount FitzAlan of Derwent (1855–1947)

1922

Richard Best (1869–1939) 
Henry Givens Burgess (1859–1937) 
Thomas Kennedy Laidlaw (1864–1943) 
Charles Curtis Craig (1869–1960) 
Sir Henry Arthur Wynne (1867–1943) 
William Henry Holmes Lyons (1843–1924)

References

Citations

1922 disestablishments in Ireland
Lists of Privy Counsellors
Ireland
History of Ireland (1801–1923)
Government of Ireland
LIst
Ireland and the Commonwealth of Nations